The Committee on Agriculture, Nutrition, and Forestry is a committee of the United States Senate empowered with legislative oversight of all matters relating to the nation's agriculture industry, farming programs, forestry and logging, and legislation relating to nutrition, home economics, and rural development.

The current chair is Democrat Debbie Stabenow of Michigan, and the ranking member is Republican John Boozman of Arkansas.

History
Founded in 1825 the committee was formed at the request of Senator William Findlay from Pennsylvania. Arguing that agriculture was as important to national progress as commerce and manufacturing, Findlay succeeded in persuading the full Senate to divide the Committee on Commerce and Manufactures into two separate committees. The Committee on Agriculture was formed by resolution on December 9, 1825.

During the first four decades of the existence of this committee, the need for it was repeatedly called into question. At that time in America, nearly ⅔ of the population was directly engaged in agriculture. As such, issues related to agriculture overlapped with areas covered by other committees and were often referred to those committees instead of the Agriculture Committee.

Following a debate over the necessity of various committees to have need of the services of a dedicated clerk, a Special Committee was formed to investigate ways to "reduce the number and increase the efficiency of the committees." On February 17, 1857, the Special Committee submitted a plan of reorganization for the committees that did not include the Agriculture Committee. During a special session of the Senate, on March 5, 1857, the Senate approved the Special Committees recommendations and the Committee on Agriculture was dissolved.

In 1862, the country was embroiled in the Civil War, a large influx of immigrants was occurring and the nation was moving towards industrialization. That year, President Abraham Lincoln signed the Organic Act recreating the Department of Agriculture.

It became the Committee on Agriculture and Forestry in 1884, a reflection of the growing importance of forests to the country's needs. It was renamed again to the Committee on Agriculture, Nutrition, and Forestry in 1977. Nutrition was added to the name after the Food and Agriculture Act of 1977 directed the Department of Agriculture to "conduct more human nutrition research, establish a national nutrition education program and develop a system to monitor America's nutritional status".

Jurisdiction
In accordance of Rule XXV of the United States Senate, all proposed legislation, messages, petitions, memorials, and other matters relating to the following subjects are referred to the Agriculture Committee:
 Agricultural economics and research.
 Agricultural extension services and experiment stations.
 Agricultural production, marketing, and stabilization of prices.
 Agriculture and agricultural commodities.
 Animal industry and diseases.
 Crop insurance and soil conservation.
 Farm credit and farm security.
 Food from fresh waters.
 Food stamp programs.
 Forestry, and forest reserves and wilderness areas other than those created from the public domain.
 Home economics.
 Human nutrition.
 Inspection of livestock, meat, and agricultural products.
 Pests and pesticides.
 Plant industry, soils, and agricultural engineering.
 Rural development, rural electrification, and watersheds.
 School nutrition programs.

The Agriculture Committee is also charged "to study and review, on a comprehensive basis, matters relating to food, nutrition, and hunger, both in the United States and in foreign countries, and rural affairs, and report thereon from time to time."

Members, 118th Congress

Subcommittees

Chairs
The committee, under its various names, has been chaired by the following senators:

Committee on Agriculture, 1825–1857

Committee on Agriculture, 1863–1884

Committee on Agriculture and Forestry, 1884–1977

Committee on Agriculture, Nutrition, and Forestry, 1977–present

Historical committee rosters

117th Congress

Subcommittees

116th Congress

Subcommittees 

Source

115th Congress

Subcommittees

114th Congress

Subcomittees

113th Congress

Committees

See also
List of current United States Senate committees
United States House Committee on Agriculture (House counterpart)

References

External links
 Senate Agriculture, Nutrition, and Forestry Committee (Archive)
 Senate Agriculture, Nutrition, and Forestry Committee. Legislation activity and reports, Congress.gov.
 The United States Senate Committee on Agriculture, Nutrition, and Forestry 1825 – 1998 (including Committee membership lists),
 Government Printing Office: Committee reports, 106th Congress-present
 Commodity Futures Trading Commission
 Farm Credit Administration
 Rules of the United States Senate

Agriculture
Senate Committee on Agriculture, Nutrition, and Forestry
1825 establishments in the United States